Agyneta rugosa is a species of sheet weaver found in the Azores. It was described by Wunderlich in 1992.

References

rugosa
Endemic arthropods of the Azores
Spiders of Europe
Spiders described in 1992